William Wilson (born 1902) was an English footballer who played for Portsmouth, Port Vale, Walsall, Stafford Rangers, Worcester City, Bristol Rovers, Willenhall, and Wellington Town.

Career
Wilson played for Seaham Harbour and Portsmouth, before moving north to join Port Vale in February 1921. He only played two Second Division games before being released from The Old Recreation Ground at the end of the season. He moved on to Walsall, Stafford Rangers, Worcester City, Bristol Rovers, Willenhall, and Wellington Town.

Career statistics
Source:

References

1902 births
Year of death missing
Sportspeople from Seaham
Footballers from County Durham
English footballers
Association football forwards
Portsmouth F.C. players
Port Vale F.C. players
Walsall F.C. players
Stafford Rangers F.C. players
Worcester City F.C. players
Bristol Rovers F.C. players
Willenhall F.C. players
Telford United F.C. players
English Football League players